Marfeel, Inc. is an ad tech platform that allows publishers to create, optimize and monetize their mobile websites.

The company was founded in Barcelona on October 6, 2011 by Xavi Beumala and Juan Margenat, with the two also acting as the company's executives.

History
Marfeel was established in 2011 in Barcelona by Xavi Beumala, and Juan Margenat; Beumala was an Adobe employee, while Margenat was a civil engineer active in Barcelona's startup scene. Shortly after its establishment, Marfeel was a competitor at The TechCrunch Barcelona Meetup, a competition it eventually won. Prior to requesting its first funding, the company was accepted in two startup accelerators: Wayra, Telefónica's's accelerator and SeedRocket. The initial idea came as Beumala noticed that most websites, when displayed in mobile devices or tablets, offered a rather impractical duplicate of their desktop version. Beumala and Margenat, both avid technology fans, thought that they could combine these interests to create a business solution to the problem.

Marfeel raised $2 million in 2013, in a Series A round. The round was led by Nauta Capital, with Elaia Partners, BDMI, and Wayra also investing. After announcing a 300% growth in 2015, Marfeel was listed in The Next Web's European Tech5 in March 2015. In January 2015, Marfeel became a certified Google partner, becoming Spain's first Google recommended mobile vendor. The company initiated a Series B funding round in late 2015, receiving a sum of $3.5 million. Marfeel aimed at using the funding to open an office in New York, expand its business the United States, and improve its technology.

In April 2016, TechCrunch announced Marfeel's full support for Facebook's newly-launched Instant Articles, providing a mobile publishing format that enables news publishers to distribute articles to Facebook's app, loading and displaying content significantly faster than the standard mobile web, within Facebook itself. Marfeel customer websites are fully Instant Articles- enabled and optimized.

Services
Marfeel has developed a platform that creates a mobile website for online publications, optimizing the traffic, engagement, and monetization of their website.

References

2011 establishments in Spain
Companies based in Barcelona
Mobile marketing
Mobile content
Mobile web
Digital marketing companies
Publishing
Advertising industry